The Hasse–Davenport relations, introduced by , are two related identities for Gauss sums, one called the Hasse–Davenport lifting relation, and the other called the Hasse–Davenport product relation. The Hasse–Davenport lifting relation is an equality in number theory relating Gauss sums over different fields.  used it to calculate the zeta function of a Fermat hypersurface over a finite field, which motivated the Weil conjectures.

Gauss sums are analogues of the gamma function over finite fields, and the Hasse–Davenport product relation is the analogue of Gauss's multiplication formula

Hasse–Davenport lifting relation 
Let F be a finite field with q elements, and Fs be the field such that [Fs:F] = s, that is, s is the dimension of the vector space Fs over F.

Let  be a multiplicative character from F to the complex numbers.

Let 

Let ψ be some nontrivial additive character of F, and let 

Let 
 
be the Gauss sum over F, and let

Then the Hasse–Davenport lifting relation states that

Hasse–Davenport product relation 
The Hasse–Davenport product relation states that

where ρ is a multiplicative character of exact order m dividing q–1 and χ is any multiplicative character and ψ is a non-trivial additive character.

References 

 Reprinted in Oeuvres Scientifiques/Collected Papers by André Weil 

Cyclotomic fields